The Daniel Pinkham House is a historic house at 400 The Hill in Portsmouth, New Hampshire.  Built c. 1813–15, it is one of the finest Federal period houses surviving on the city's north side.  It was listed on the National Register of Historic Places in 1972.

Description and history
The Daniel Pinkham House is one of a cluster of houses known as The Hill, located south of Deer Street north of downtown Portsmouth, that was created as the result of a road works project in the 1970s.  It is a three-story wood-frame structure, with a low-pitch hip roof and clapboarded exterior.  Its main facade is five bays wide with a center entrance; the windows are simply trimmed, with smaller windows on the third floor.  Its front entry is flanked by Adamesque pilasters with rope molding, and topped by a semicircular fanlight window.  The interior features original cornices, doors, and other woodwork.

The house was built c. 1813–15 by Daniel and Isaac Pinkham, in the wake of Portland's devastating 1813 fire.  The latter was a noted local cabinetmaker, whose work is presumed to decorate the interior.  Although its exterior was altered in the late 19th century by the addition of Victorian elements, these were removed when the house was renovated and moved in the 1970s.

See also
National Register of Historic Places listings in Rockingham County, New Hampshire

References

Houses on the National Register of Historic Places in New Hampshire
Federal architecture in New Hampshire
Houses completed in 1813
Houses in Portsmouth, New Hampshire
National Register of Historic Places in Portsmouth, New Hampshire